Megalocolaspoides is a genus of leaf beetles in the subfamily Eumolpinae. It is found in Southeast Asia.

Species
 Megalocolaspoides borneoensis Medvedev, 2009 – Borneo
 Megalocolaspoides fulvescens Medvedev, 2005 – Vietnam

References

Eumolpinae
Chrysomelidae genera
Beetles of Asia